Sarah Glendening (born September 20, 1982) is a former American actress. In 2009, she joined the cast as the fifth actress to portray Lucy Montgomery on the CBS soap As the World Turns. She played the role until the show's cancellation in September 2010. In October 2010, it was announced she would be joining All My Children as the second actress to portray Marissa Tasker.

Theater
Glendening participated in multiple productions during her time at Carnegie Mellon including Wild Party with classmate Megan Hilty, Me and My Girl, Hello, Dolly!, and The Music Man (which was featured in the film Pittsburgh).

In 2005, Glendening made her Broadway debut in Good Vibrations, as part of the Ensemble and as understudy for the role of "Caroline", alongside future-husband Brandon Wardell who played the lead "Dave".

In July 2007, Glendening played the lead "Susan" in tick, tick...BOOM at the Adirondack Theatre Festival in Glens Falls, NY. The show was so well received that an additional performance was added, a first in the troupe's history of thirteen years.

In the spring of 2008, Glendening starred as "Diana" in the world premiere of the stage production of Mask, adapted from the film of the same name, at Pasadena Playhouse in Pasadena, CA.

During the summer of 2008, Glendening performed with Joe Iconis and The Black Suits alongside Krysta Rodriguez during The Summer Play Festival in New York City.

From April 13 to May 23, 2010, Glendening appeared on stage as "Molly" in the world premiere of Nightmare Alley, adapted from the William Lindsay Gresham's book of the same name, at Geffen Playhouse in Los Angeles.

From October 29 to November 4, 2010, Glendening participated in the stage workshop production of Loveless, Texas with Boomerang Theatre Company at Peter Jay Sharp Theater in New York City.

In the fall of 2012, Glendening and husband Brandon served as production managers on Delusion: The Blood Rite, an interactive haunted play in Los Angeles, created by Hollywood stuntman Jon Braver and produced by Neil Patrick Harris.

During the fall 2013, Sarah and Brandon produced the third installment of Jon Braver's Haunted Play, Delusion: The Masque of Mortality.

In December 2013, Glendening performed in the Open Fist Theatre Company production of BOTH: A Hard Day's Silent Night, a Beatles Nativity in Los Angeles.

Glendening has also participated in Neil Patrick Harris's interactive theater experience Accomplice: The Show in Los Angeles and New York City, which describes itself as "Part Game. Part Theater. Part Tour. All Fun."

In 2014, Sarah and Brandon produced the fourth iteration of Delusion: Lies Within.

Television
Glendening started her Daytime career with a guest role on Guiding Light. She later joined CBS' As the World Turns as the fifth actress to portray Lucy Montgomery, replacing Spencer Grammer. She appeared on a recurring basis, visiting the show from December 24, 2008 to January 7, 2009, she then returned again from February 26, 2009 to May 13, 2009. She would return again in July for another short stay due to the cancellation of the series, when she returned from July 22, 2010 to August 13, 2010.

Glendening was scheduled to appear in the Lifetime US TV remake of the British series, Mistresses. The series was to star actress Holly Marie Combs, Cory Monteith, Brooke Burns, and Rochelle Aytes. Lifetime passed on the pilot, in favor of Drop Dead Diva. ABC later announced that they planned to shoot their own pilot, starring Combs' Charmed co-star, Alyssa Milano which went on to premiere in 2013.

Following the cancellation of As the World Turns, it was announced in October that she would replace Brittany Allen in her role of Marissa Tasker, ex-wife of JR Chandler and long-lost twin sister of deceased Babe Carey. Glendening first appeared on air on December 27, 2010. She remained with the series until its finale in September 2011. Glendening's character Marissa was involved in a same-sex relationship with popular character Bianca Montgomery, garnering a large fan following who named the couple "Minx".

She has also made appearances on shows such as Cold Case and Law and Order: Criminal Intent.

Film
Glendening can be seen in the 2006 mockumentary Pittsburgh about the regional theater production of The Music Man, starring Jeff Goldblum, Ed Begley Jr., Illeana Douglas, and Moby. Other notable appearances in the film include Conan O'Brien, Ashley Judd, Alanis Morissette, Tom Cavanagh, and Mario Lopez's wife Courtney.

Glendening was in the 2009 independent comedy romance The Good Guy, opposite Alexis Bledel, Andrew McCarthy, Anna Chlumsky, Bryan Greenberg, Colin Egglesfield, and Denise Vasi (who was also on All My Children with Glendening), which screened at The Tribeca Film Festival.

In May 2011, Glendening was cast to star as "nerdy" girl Mandi in the feature-length film Angry Video Game Nerd: The Movie, based on the popular cult web series, and character, of the same name. She starred alongside Jeremy Suarez and the film's writer, director, producer and main star James Rolfe. The film has been released starting with a showing at Grauman's Egyptian Theatre, then at various film festivals and then other theaters around the US and Canada.

In 2012, Glendening starred opposite Eric Roberts in the satirical short Heal Thyself, which premiered at The Hollywood Film Festival and was used as a conversation piece during a healthcare forum at UCLA's Labor Center.

Glendening was also seen in Gala & Godfrey: The Classics, released in 2014. This project was her daughter Wendy's introduction on film when only a few days old.

Music
Glendening is closely associated with New York City musical theatre writer Joe Iconis, having performed in a number of his concerts and shows.

Glendening often performs in composer and lyricist Adam Gwon's showcases.

Her voice can be heard on the Things to Ruin (Original Cast Recording) and Annie - The Broadway Musical (30th Anniversary Production).

Sarah Glendening continues to sing and perform on stage.

Filmography

References

External links
 
 
 Marissa Tasker's bio

1982 births
21st-century American actresses
Actresses from Florida
American women singers
American musical theatre actresses
American soap opera actresses
Carnegie Mellon University College of Fine Arts alumni
Living people
People from Bradenton, Florida